In the month of November 2015 ridership of Canadian large urban transit was 142.7 million passenger trips.

The following is a list of public transit authorities in Canada.

References

External links

Ontario, Ministry of Transportation, Public Transit Systems in Ontario
Quebec Portal: Public transit
Census Profile, 2021 Census of Population